Sky News Ireland was a programming block on Sky News broadcast in Ireland. It was a separate feed from the UK and international versions of Sky News. Sky News Ireland was broadcast from its studios in Dublin. The service was also available in the UK and around the world on Sky News Active (Red Button) service.

Background

Sky News launched in Europe in February 1989. In May 2004, Sky News confirmed the launch of an Irish version of the channel. Previous to this Sky News was broadcast in the Republic of Ireland with specific opt-out advertising and sponsorship. Specialized Irish news content aired for 30 minutes each night from 19:00 and 22:00. These special broadcasts were presented by Gráinne Seoige, news anchor Ray Kennedy and Brian Daly. On 24 October 2005, the 19:00h programme was moved to 18:30h, this put it in direct competition with RTÉ News: Six One.

The bulletin was also available to international viewers via the Sky News Active service (red button) which proved quite popular with the Irish diaspora abroad. The channel was seen by European viewers with a DVB-S satellite receiver across Europe. Sky News Ireland was the first Irish news service to be broadcast in widescreen, beating plans by RTÉ News and TV3 News. On 27 December 2005, it was confirmed Sky News Ireland's 18:30h bulletin was to be simulcast on Sky1 from 9 January 2006.

Reporters for the service included Jonathan Healy, Alison O'Reilly, Orla Chennnaoui, David Blevins, Eibhlín Ní Chonghaile, Geraldine Lynagh, Amanda Cassidy, Aisling Ni Choisdealbha, and John Sherwin. Weather on Sky News Ireland was usually presented by Lisa Burke.

In October 2006, viewer ratings for the 22:00h programme were 135,000 avg; the 18:30 programme received 65,000 avg. (Neilsen).

Closure

On 31 October 2006, it was reported that the programme block would cease at the end of November 2006. From 3 November 2006, no further Sky News Ireland bulletins were broadcast when the staff walked out. Ray Kennedy presented the final programme at 10.00pm on 3 November after which the staff left in protest at the handling of the closure by their British Sky News managers in London

Although specific Irish programming has now ended, Sky News continues to air an Irish opt-out advertising and sponsorship feed. Sky News continue to host studios and offices in Dublin and Belfast.

References

External links

Television stations in Ireland
Sky News
Sky television channels
Defunct television channels
2004 establishments in Ireland
Television channels and stations established in 2004
Television channels and stations disestablished in 2006